Madonna and Child is a 1475 tempera on panel painting by Giovanni Bellini. It was stolen from Madonna dell'Orto in Venice on 1 March 1993. It measures 75 cm by 50 cm.

1475 paintings
Venice